Sumner County Schools (SCS) is a public school district in Sumner County, Tennessee, United States. It enrolls approximately 29,000 students and is the eighth largest school district in Tennessee.

Schools

Elementary (K–5) 
 Anderson Elementary School
 Beech Elementary School
 Benny Bills Elementary School
 Bethpage Elementary School
 Clyde Riggs Elementary School
 Gene Brown Elementary School
 George Whitten Elementary School
 Guild Elementary School
 H. B. Williams Elementary School
 Howard Elementary School
 Indian Lake Elementary School
 Lakeside Park Elementary School
 Liberty Creek Elementary School
 Madison Creek Elementary School
 Millersville Elementary School
 Nannie Berry Elementary School
 North Sumner Elementary School
 Oakmont Elementary School
 Portland Gateview Elementary School
 Station Camp Elementary School
 Union Elementary STEAM School (year-round school)
 Vena Stuart Elementary School
 Walton Ferry Elementary School
 Watt Hardison Elementary School
 Westmoreland Elementary School
 Wiseman Elementary School

Middle (6–8) 
 Ellis Middle School
 Hawkins Middle School
 Joe Shafer Middle School
 Knox Doss at Drakes Creek Middle School
 Liberty Creek Middle School
 Portland East Middle School
 Portland West Middle School
 Rucker-Stewart Middle School
 Station Camp Middle School
 T. W. Hunter Middle School
 Westmoreland Middle School
 White House Middle School

High (9–12) 
 Beech Senior High School
 E. B. Wilson Night School
 Gallatin High School
 Hendersonville High School
 Liberty Creek High School
 Portland High School
 Station Camp High School
 Westmoreland High School
 White House High School

Magnet 
 Merrol Hyde Magnet School (K–12)

Alternative 
 R. T. Fisher Alternative School (K–12)

References 

School districts in Tennessee
Education in Sumner County, Tennessee